Kauko Antero Pirinen (10 January 1915, in Eno – 31 May 1999, in Helsinki), was a Finnish historian, professor in church history at Helsinki University from 1961, and professor in general church history 1963–80.

Pirinen was one of the leading 20th-century historians in Finland and one of the country's excellent church historians. His specialty was Finland's medieval history, Savonian and Karelian history, and church law.

Bibliography 
 Suomen vaakunat ja kaupunginsinetit. (1949, with A.W. Rancken)
 Turun tuomiokapituli keskiajan lopulla. (1956)
 Turun tuomiokapituli uskonpuhdistuksen murroksessa. (1962)
 A History of Finland. (1962, with Eino Jutikkala)
 Schaumanin kirkkolain synty. (1985)
 Suomen kirkon historia. (1 vol. 1991)

20th-century Finnish historians
Members of the Orthodox Church of Finland
1915 births
1999 deaths
Academic staff of the University of Helsinki